is a 1956 Japanese film directed by Hiroshi Inagaki and starring Toshirō Mifune. Shot in Eastmancolor, it is the third and final film of Inagaki's Samurai Trilogy.

The film is adapted from Eiji Yoshikawa's novel Musashi, originally released as a serial in the Japanese newspaper Asahi Shimbun, between 1935 and 1939. The novel is loosely based on the life of the famous Japanese swordsman, Miyamoto Musashi. The preceding two parts of the trilogy are Samurai I: Musashi Miyamoto (1954) and Samurai II: Duel at Ichijoji Temple (1955).

Plot
Miyamoto abandons his life as a knight errant. He's sought as a teacher and vassal by the Shogun, Japan's de facto leader. He is also challenged to fight by the supremely confident and skillful Sasaki Kojiro. Miyamoto agrees to fight Sasaki in a year's time but rejects the Shogun's patronage, choosing instead to live on the edge of a village, raising vegetables. He's followed there by Otsu and later by Akemi, both in love with him. The year ends as Miyamoto assists the villagers against a band of brigands.

In the large city of Edo in Japan, Sasaki kills multiple men in a battle in the street. The commotion resulting from the battle in the street garners the attention of Miyamoto who is nearby in the city. Miyamoto leaves his room to see what has occurred and notices the dead men in the street as well as a note from Sasaki claiming responsibility for the killing.

Sasaki and Miyamoto eventually meet one another and agree to a fight. However, on the day the fight is planned, Miyamoto decides to delay the fight for a year. During this year before the fight, Sasaki becomes acquainted with the upper class, while Miyamoto begins farming near a small village. Miyamoto seeks Otsu's forgiveness and accepts her love, then sets off across the water to Ganryu Island for his final contest. Sasaki also travels to Ganryu Island for their fight.

During this fight, Miyamoto kills Sasaki and is victorious. Miyamoto is unhappy about killing Sasaki, calling him "the greatest swordsman" he ever encountered, and silently mourns for him.

Production
The film Samurai III: Duel at Ganryu Island, made in 1956, came after the end of the Allied occupation of Japan following World War II. Following World War II "the Allied occupation initially restricted films promoting feudal values, putting the kibosh on this most Japanese of action genres".

This attitude relaxed somewhat in 1949, as the Occupation became more concerned with the threat of international communism and less with jidaigeki and chanbara. Inagaki himself had directed Kanketsu Sasaki Kojirô: Ganryû-jima kettô, an earlier black and white film about Sasaki that climaxes with the fatal duel between Miyamoto and Sasaki, in 1951. That film also featured Mifune in a brief appearance as Miyamoto that nonetheless won him a share of top billing, but starred Tomoemon Otani, a Kabuki actor who specialized in women's roles on stage, as Sasaki.

After the Allies left Japan in 1952, "the way was clear for the golden age of the samurai film", allowing Inagaki to specialize in the genre he had been most closely associated with before the war. World War II, the Allied occupation of Japan and then the Allies leaving certainly influenced Japanese film. Additionally, the film's character Musashi Miyamoto was an actual person who lived from 1584-1645 and was "famed for his two-handed fighting technique and his delicate touch with the Zen ink brush". The film also relates to Miyamoto’s actual battle with Sasaki, which "took place on April 13, 1612 on Ganryu Island, located off the coast of the Bizen Province".

Cast 
 Toshirō Mifune as Miyamoto Musashi
 Kōji Tsuruta as Sasaki Kojirō
 Kaoru Yachigusa as Otsu
 Michiko Saga as Omitsu
 Mariko Okada as Akemi
 Takashi Shimura as Sado Nagaoka, the court official
 Minoru Chiaki as Sasuke, the boatman
 Takamaru Sasaki as Omitsu's father
 Daisuke Katō as Toji Gion
 Haruo Tanaka as Kumagoro, the horse thief
 Kichijiro Ueda as Priest Ogon
 Kokuten Kodo as Old Priest Nikkan
 Ikio Sawamura as Innkeeper

References

External links
 
 
 Samurai III an essay by Bruce Eder at the Criterion Collection

1956 films
1950s martial arts films
Films about duels
Films directed by Hiroshi Inagaki
Jidaigeki films
Samurai films
Cultural depictions of Miyamoto Musashi
1950s Japanese films